"Green Christmas" is a Christmas song by the Barenaked Ladies from the soundtrack for the 2000 film How The Grinch Stole Christmas!. It was later re-recorded as a studio acoustic version for the Christmas compilation Maybe This Christmas Too? in 2003, and re-recorded again for the band's own holiday album, Barenaked for the Holidays, released in 2004. The song was performed on several television appearances promoting the album.

References

2000 songs
American Christmas songs
Barenaked Ladies songs
Songs written for films
Songs written by Steven Page
Songs written by Ed Robertson